Norbugang Gewog (Dzongkha: ནོར་བུ་སྒང་) is a gewog (village block) of Pemagatshel District, Bhutan. Norbugang Gewog is part of Nganglam Dungkhag, along with Dechenling and Nganglam Gewogs.

References

External links
 https://web.archive.org/web/20100503060847/http://www.pemagatshel.gov.bt/gewogDetail.php?id=39

Gewogs of Bhutan
Pemagatshel District